The Darby Plantation is a Southern plantation located about  northwest of New Iberia, Louisiana.

History 
The Darby Plantation was founded by Jonathan Darby, an Englishman who immigrated from France in 1719. Francois inherited the Darby plantation from his father, Jean-Baptiste St. Marc Darby.  It remained in family ownership for more than 150 years.

The house c. 1813 had two stories, with a central hall plan. The first story was solid brick; the second story was briquette-entre-poteaux, with full or broken brick filling spaces between heavy cypress posts. It was built between 1813 and 1820 for Francois St. Marc Darby and his wife, Felicite de St. Amant.

During mid 1970s, the already abandoned house, at that time it was property of Attakapas Historical Society, was completely destroyed by fire.

Around 2002, architect Perry Segura started building a replica of the mansion at its original place, while modifying its original appearance. The water cistern near the house was replaced by a three-car garage, the exterior stairs were moved inside the house, the porch which wrapped the house on three sides is present only on the front and the back, and dormers were added to the roof in order to let light enter attic space. The inside is also quite differently organized as living quarters are now located downstair.

The mansion was listed on the National Register of Historic Places on March 26, 1973. The house was removed from the National Register of Historic Places list in January 2019.

See also
National Register of Historic Places listings in Iberia Parish, Louisiana

References

Notes

Plantation houses in Louisiana
Houses in Iberia Parish, Louisiana
Houses on the National Register of Historic Places in Louisiana
National Register of Historic Places in Iberia Parish, Louisiana
Former National Register of Historic Places in Louisiana